Magherally is a civil parish and townland (of 491 acres) in County Down, Northern Ireland. It is largely situated in the historic barony of Iveagh Lower, Lower Half, with one townland (Tullyhinan) in the barony of Iveagh Lower, Upper Half. The townland of Magherally contains the parish church.

History
The parish appears with the name Analle in the Papal Taxation of 1306 and the original church name may have been Abhaill (apple-tree). The Machaire (plain) part of the name appears in the 17th century.

Civil parish of Magherally
The civil parish includes the village of Corbet.

Townlands
The civil parish contains the following townlands:

Ballycross
Ballymoney
Corbet
Drumneth
Kilmacrew
Magherally
Mullafernaghan
Tonaghmore
Tullyhinan
Tullyrain

See also 
List of townlands in County Down
List of civil parishes of County Down

References

Townlands of County Down